Malbinəsi (also, Malbinesi) is a village and municipality in the Yevlakh Rayon of Azerbaijan.  It has a population of 2,168.

References 

Populated places in Yevlakh District